Alexander Radó (5 November 1899, Újpest, near Budapest – 20 August 1981, Budapest), also: Alex, Alexander Radolfi, Sándor Kálmán Reich or Alexander Rado, was a Hungarian cartographer who worked as a  Soviet military intelligence-agent in World War II.

Radó (codename "DORA") was also a member of the resistance to Nazi Germany, devoted to the service of the so-called Red Orchestra, the Soviet espionage and spy network in Western Europe between 1933 and 1945. Within the Red Orchestra he headed the Switzerland-based Red Three group, one of the most efficient components of the Soviet intelligence network.

Life

Radó was born into a Jewish family in Újpest, at the time an industrial suburb of Budapest. His father ( Gábor Reich) was first a clerk at a trading firm and later a businessman. In 1917, after graduation from gymnasium (high school), Radó was drafted into the Austro-Hungarian army and was sent to fortress artillery officer training school. Graduated at the officer candidate school in 1918, he was assigned to an artillery regiment. During this time, he also studied law as a correspondence student of the University of Budapest.

In December 1918, after the fall of Austro-Hungarian monarchy, Radó joined the Hungarian Communist Party. When the communists came to power in Hungary in March 1919, he was appointed as cartographer on the staff of a Hungarian Red Army division. Ferenc Münnich, the political commissar of the division, then made him commissar of the division's artillery.

On 1 September 1919, after the fall of the communist regime in Hungary, Radó fled to Austria. He studied geography and cartography at Vienna University and wrote on military matters in a German-language Magazine Kommunismus, published by Hungarian political emigrants in Austria.

In July 1920, he established the information agency Rosta-Wien, which he used to spread propaganda received in broadcasts from Soviet Russia. To receive these, he had bribed the head of a Vienna radio station. Information bulletins from these materials were distributed to left-wing newspapers and organizations in various countries.

In 1922, Radó moved to Germany and returned to his studies, first at Jena and then at Leipzig. In October 1923, he took part in the preparation for Comintern-planned large armed uprising in Germany and was made military chief of the communist forces in Leipzig. But the badly planned revolution had to be aborted at the last moment. Fearing arrest, Radó left Germany for the Soviet Union in September 1924. In Moscow, he worked for the All-Union Society for Cultural Contacts with Abroad (VOKS) and then for the World Economy Institute of the Communist Academy. Radó returned to Germany in 1926 and established the Berlin cartographic agency Pressgeography. He gave lectures at the Masch, the Marxist Workers' School, teaching economic geography, the history of the working class movement (Arbeitergeschichte) and imperialism.

After the Nazis came to power in Germany in 1933, Radó and his wife, Helene ("Lena"), fled through Austria to France. In Paris, Radó established the Inpress (an independent anti-Nazi press agency).

In 1935, during a visit to Moscow, Radó was approached by Artur Artuzov, deputy chief of Soviet military intelligence and by Semyon Uritsky, chief of Soviet military intelligence. Radó agreed to be their intelligence agent with the main task of obtaining intelligence on Nazi Germany. Radó failed to obtain a residence permit in Belgium, but in 1939 was permitted residence in Switzerland. He moved to Geneva and founded yet another cartographic agency, Geopress.

In 1937, Radó visited Italy to collect intelligence about the Italian military support of the Francist forces in the Spanish civil war. This intelligence was sent to Moscow through Paris Soviet military intelligence station. In 1938 Radó contacted Swiss journalist and agent Otto Pünter in Bern, who gave him military intelligence on Italy. On Italy's military support of Franco's forces he received material from "Gabel", a Yugoslav serving as Spanish Republican consul in Sushak, Yugoslavia and military intelligence on Germany from "Puasson", a German Social Democratic political emigrant living in Switzerland with sources in Germany.

In 1940, Radó contacted Alexander Foote, an English Soviet agent in Switzerland who joined Ursula Kuczynski's network in 1938. Foote became a radio operator for Radó's intelligence network, and, in March 1941, managed to establish radio communication with Moscow Centre from Lausanne. In his radio communications, Radó used the codename "Dora". In the first half of 1941, "Luiza", a Swiss intelligence officer gave Otto Puetner (and Radó) the important information, that many divisions of the German Wehrmacht were being concentrated in the East. This warning of an imminent German attack, like that from Richard Sorge and from other Soviet agents, was dismissed by Stalin.

After the outbreak of the German-Soviet War on 22 June 1941, Radó's network continued to provide Soviet General Staff with very valuable intelligence on German forces. Some of it was supplied through Puetner by "Zalter", a press officer of the French embassy in Switzerland and by "Long", a French intelligence officer who fled to Switzerland after the capitulation of France. Both had sources in Germany, among them Ernst Lemmer ("Agnessa"), editor of a German foreign policy bulletin.

In March 1942, a most valuable piece of intelligence was sent to Moscow: summer German offensive aimed at the occupation of Caucasian oilfields (Operation Blue) would begin between 31 May and 7 June 1942. Radó's network got this from Georges Blun ("Long"), provided by General Adolf Hamann, at the German OKW. Soviet command did not make proper use of this intelligence.

Through Christian Schneider, a German lawyer who had worked in the International Labour Bureau in Switzerland until 1939, Radó made contact with  Rudolf Roessler, a German political emigrant living in Lucerne. Roessler, codenamed "Lucy", apparently had extraordinary sources in Germany who provided valuable military intelligence, the Lucy spy ring. Roessler allegedly was the conduit the British used to transmit the results of their codebreaking of German cipher traffic (operation "Ultra") to the Soviets without revealing their ability to read this German code.

At the end of 1942, Abwehr and Gestapo caught up with the "Rote Kapelle", Leopold Trepper's network. There had been some contacts between both spy rings in 1940, through Anatoly Gurevich (alias "Kent"), a Soviet undercover intelligence officer and so Radó's network became known to the Germans. They even obtained the radio cipher used by Radó's network which enabled them to decrypt some of Radó's radio communications from Switzerland. Meanwhile, Radó's network continued to supply Moscow Centre with valuable intelligence. In April 1943, Stalin received news about the planned German offensive near Kursk (provided by "Werter", a Roessler source in Germany).

During the second half of 1943, the Germans persuaded Swiss authorities to act against Radó's network. Using mobile radio direction finders, Swiss police tracked down one of Radó's radio transmitters operated by Swiss agents Edmond Hamel and Olga Hamel. They were arrested on 14 October 1943. On the same day Margarita Bolli was caught, an Italian emigrant living in Switzerland and a radio operator. Radó went into hiding. On 20 November 1943 they caught Alexander Foote. Christian Schneider and two other contacts in Switzerland were arrested on 19 April 1944. Rudolf Roessler was arrested on 19 May 1944.

On 16 September 1944, Radó and his wife Helen, the sister of Hermann Scherchen, a German conductor in whose home they had hidden, illegally crossed the Swiss-French border on a French train with the help of the French Maquis from Upper Savoy. On 24 September, they reached Paris. Radó contacted a Soviet military intelligence agent and in January 1945, Radó and Leopold Trepper were evacuated via plane to the Soviet Union. Due to military operations in Germany, a direct flight to the Soviet Union from Paris was impossible, so the plane flew over Northern Africa. Using a stopover in Cairo, Radó, who suspected his arrest on arrival in the Soviet Union, escaped and managed to enter the British embassy under an alias. He applied for political asylum, but this was denied and Radó tried to commit suicide, but survived and was hospitalized. He was extradited by Egypt to the Soviet Union based on a false accusation, in August 1945 he was brought to Moscow under guard. In December 1946, he was sentenced by a Special Council of MGB without trial to 10 years on espionage charges.

Following the death of Stalin, Radó was released in November 1954, and allowed to return to Hungary. In 1956, he was officially rehabilitated by the Military Collegium of the Supreme Court of the USSR. In 1955, Radó was appointed chief of the Hungarian cartographic service. In 1958, he was appointed to the chair of cartography in Budapest Karl Marx University of Economic Sciences.

In 1971, he published his memoirs in Hungarian. They were translated into several languages. But a first uncensored edition, based on the original manuscript, was only published in 2006, in Budapest. He died in Budapest in 1981, aged 81.

Sources 
 Radó’s memories “Pod Psevdonimom 'Dora'” (in Russian)
 Russian Jewish site
 Russian history site
 Arthur Koestler In his autobiography The Invisible Writing, devotes a chapter to Radó under the heading “Homage to a Spy”. In the mid-1930s Radó and his wife had helped the struggling Koestler and at one stage in 1935–36 Radó had employed Koestler in a mysterious 'news reporting agency' which he was managing at the time. Koestler's book was first published in 1954. The contents make it clear that at the time of writing Koestler believed that after the war Radó had been liquidated by the Soviets. The 'Danube' edition reprint of the book, published in 1969, carries the original chapter unamended (pp. 368–378). .

References

Hungarian cartographers
Hungarian spies for the Soviet Union
World War II spies for the Soviet Union
Red Orchestra (espionage)
Hungarian Jews
People from Újpest
1899 births
1981 deaths
GRU officers
Hungarian expatriates in the Soviet Union
Prisoners and detainees of the Soviet Union
Hungarian people imprisoned abroad
People extradited from Egypt
People extradited to the Soviet Union
Academic staff of the Corvinus University of Budapest
20th-century cartographers